852 Wladilena is a Phocaea asteroid from the inner region of the asteroid belt. It is named after the Russian Communist leader Vladimir Lenin.

References

External links 
 
 

000852
Discoveries by Sergei Belyavsky
Named minor planets
19160402